Marjolijn Greeve (born 21 July 1938) is a Dutch equestrian. She competed in the individual dressage event at the 1976 Summer Olympics.

References

External links
 

1938 births
Living people
Dutch female equestrians
Dutch dressage riders
Olympic equestrians of the Netherlands
Equestrians at the 1976 Summer Olympics
People from Wassenaar
Sportspeople from South Holland
20th-century Dutch women